The Houtanjing Sky Bridge is a pedestrian suspension bridge in Shetou Township, Changhua County in Taiwan.

Architecture
The bridge spans over a length of 204 meters with 265 steps. The clearance below it to the bottom of the valley is 150 meters.

See also
 List of bridges in Taiwan

References

Bridges in Changhua County
Suspension bridges in Taiwan